Marat Raviliyevich Alykov (born 20 August 1959) is a Russian pilot.

Alykov, an ethnic Tatar, was born on 20 August 1959 in Kapustin Yar in the  Vladimirovskaya District of Astrakhan Oblast to a military family. He joined the Soviet Army in 1976, and in 1980 graduated from the Kachinsk Military Aviation School. Alykov flew the Sukhoi Su-17 between 1983 and 1984 in the Soviet–Afghan War and was awarded the Order of the Red Star. After leaving the Air Force, Alykov graduated from the Test Pilot School and became a Mikoyan test pilot. For his actions in testing aircraft, Alykov was awarded the title Hero of the Russian Federation in 1998. Alykov currently works as the general director of the aviation maintenance company International Center of Business Aviation.

Early life and military service 
Alykov was born on 20 August 1959 in Kapustin Yar to a military family. He was drafted into the Soviet Army in 1976. Alykov graduated from the Kachinsk Military Aviation School in 1980. He served in Soviet Air Force combat units. Alykov was a pilot and flight leader flying the Su-17M3 in Afghanistan from May 1983 and October 1984. Alykov made 214 sorties and was awarded the Order of the Red Star. He retired from the Air Force in 1985 with the rank of Major.

Civilian life 
In 1987, Alykov graduated from the Test Pilot School. Between 1987 and 2005, he worked as a test pilot with Mikoyan. In 1990, Alykov and navigator Yuri Bramkov flew to Canada in a MiG-29UB for the 1990 National Capital Air Show. In the summer of 1991 he flew an MiG-29 at the Cleveland National Air Show and the Harrisburg Air Show as part of "Soviet MiG-29 Friendship Tour '91". In November 1997, he tested the Mikoyan MiG-29SM on its maiden flight. He also tested the MiG-29SMT, MiG-29UBT, MiG-31, and MiG-AT. For his actions Alykov was awarded the title Hero of the Russian Federation on 31 May 1998. On 26 September 2001 he and test pilot Pavel Vlasov flew the MiG-29M2 for the first time. He received the title Honoured Test Pilot of the Russian Federation in 2003. In 2006 he graduated from the Russian Academy of Public Administration with a PhD in economics. In the same year, Alykov moved from Moscow to Zhukovsky. By 2014, Alykov was general director of the International Center of Business Aviation, a business aviation maintenance company.

He is a member of the Club of Heroes of the Soviet Union, Heroes of the Russian Federation and Full Cavaliers of the Order of Glory.

References 

1959 births
Russian aviators
Heroes of the Russian Federation
Russian Aircraft Corporation MiG
People from Znamensk, Astrakhan Oblast
Tatar people of Russia
Living people
Soviet aviators
Recipients of the Order "For Personal Courage"
Soviet military personnel of the Soviet–Afghan War
Soviet test pilots
Soviet Air Force officers